Saint-André-de-Cubzac (literally Saint-André of Cubzac) is a commune in the Gironde department in Nouvelle-Aquitaine in south-western France.

Its inhabitants are called Cubzaguais.

Population

Notable residents
Jacques-Yves Cousteau is buried in the Cousteau family plot.

It is also the birthplace of Jean Marie Antoine de Lanessan.

See also
Communes of the Gironde department

References

External links

 http://www.saint-andre-de-cubzac.com/

Communes of Gironde